Pilar Pallete (born 3 September 1928) is a Peruvian actress and the widow of American actor John Wayne.

Biography
Pallete was born as the daughter of a Peruvian senator in the Paita Port (northern Peru). She married and divorced professional big-game hunter Richard Weldy. She met John Wayne, 21 years her senior, in Tingo María, Peru, around 1952 or 1953, while still married to Weldy. Wayne was in Peru scouting locations for The Alamo.

In 1953, Pallete came to Los Angeles to dub a film in English, when she ran into John Wayne for the second time. A year later on November 1, 1954, they married in Kona, Hawaii, the same day Wayne's divorce became final. Pallete retired from her motion picture career to be a wife and mother to their three children: Aissa, Ethan, and Marisa.

During the next ten years of their marriage, they traveled extensively, usually on location for John Wayne's many films. In 1965, they moved to Newport Beach, California. She rented a studio inside the Fernleaf Courtyard, in Corona Del Mar, California, where she would entertain her clients outdoors with coffee and finger sandwiches and found herself, one year later, with a full-time restaurant.

Personal life
Pallete married Wayne in 1954, and they remained married until his death in 1979. In 1973 she moved out of their house; however, they were never legally separated or divorced. She has always made clear that they remained married until his death.

In 1984, five years after Wayne's death, Pallete married Stephen Stewart, a municipal court judge. The marriage was brief, with Pallete later describing the relationship as a "two-week mistake."
In 1998, Pallete married Jesse Upchurch, a travel company executive.

Filmography
The Alamo - unknown (uncredited) (1960)
Hollywood Greats - episode – "John Wayne" – herself (1984)
John Wayne Standing Tall – TV movie/documentary – herself (1989)
Biography - episode – "John Wayne: The Unquiet Man" – herself (1998)
Biography - episode – "John Wayne: American Legend" – herself (1998)
The Duke at Fox – documentary short – herself (2011)
The Personal Property of John Wayne – herself (2011)

References

External links

 

1928 births
Actresses from Newport Beach, California
Living people
Actresses from Lima
20th-century Peruvian actresses
Peruvian emigrants to the United States
Peruvian film actresses
John Wayne
People from Piura Region